Preston Fishergate Hill was a railway station at the bottom of Fishergate Hill in Preston.  It formed the northeastern terminus of the West Lancashire Railway which built a direct railway link between Southport and Preston. The station was also known as Preston West Lancashire Station (OS 1:2500 1st Ed map).

History

The terminus opened on 15 September 1882 and was designed by Charles Henry Driver. It closed to passengers on 16 July 1900 when the West Lancashire Railway was absorbed by its rival, the Lancashire and Yorkshire Railway (Biddle, 1989). From that date, the new owners directed passenger traffic to the joint L&YR and LNWR station closer to the centre of town (Cotterall, 1982).

Thereafter, the station remained open for goods traffic until 25 January 1965 but saw occasional passenger specials during the Preston Guild which is held every 20 years.

For many years after closure to passengers the premises were let by a firm of provender merchants for use as offices.  The station has since been demolished and housing now occupies the site.

References
Notes

Bibliography
 Biddle, G. (1989) The Railways Around Preston - A Historical Review, Scenes from the Past: No. 6, Foxline Publishing, 
 Cotterall, J.E. (1982) The West Lancashire Railway, The Oakwood Press, 
 
 Ordnance Survey First Edition 1:2500 map accessed via MARIO 4 April 2007

Disused railway stations in Preston
Former Lancashire and Yorkshire Railway stations
Railway stations in Great Britain opened in 1882
Railway stations in Great Britain closed in 1900
Charles Henry Driver railway stations